This list of Miami Dade College alumni includes graduates, non-graduate former students and current students of Miami Dade College.

Arts and entertainment

Film and theater

Art and literature

Music

Television

Athletics

Maurice Kemp (born 1991), basketball player in the Israeli Basketball Premier League
Xavier Munford (born 1992), basketball player for Hapoel Tel Aviv of the Israeli Basketball Premier League

Banking and finance

Business

Education

Journalism, broadcast and print

Law

Nonprofit organizations

Politics

References

External links
 MDC.edu
 Miami Dade College Foundation Alumni Network

Miami-related lists
Lists of people by university or college in Florida